Hypertree may refer to one of the following:

Hypertree, a special kind of hypergraph, e.g., a hypergraph without cycles
Hypertree decomposition in constraint satisfaction
Hypertree network, a type of computer/communication network topology
Hyperbolic tree, a visualization method for hierarchical structures